The 2009 Men's Hockey Africa Cup of Nations was the eighth edition of the Men's Hockey Africa Cup of Nations, the quadrennial international men's field hockey championship of Africa organised by the African Hockey Federation. It was held alongside the women's tournament in Accra, Ghana from 10 to 16 July 2009.

The four-time defending champions South Africa won their fifth title and qualified for the 2010 Men's Hockey World Cup by defeating Egypt 4–1 in the final. The hosts Ghana won the bronze medal by defeating Nigeria 3–2 after extra time.

Results

Preliminary round

Third place game

Final

Final standings

See also
2009 Women's Hockey Africa Cup of Nations

References

Men's Hockey Africa Cup of Nations
Africa Cup of Nations
Hockey Africa Cup of Nations
Sport in Accra
International field hockey competitions hosted by Ghana
Hockey Africa Cup of Nations
21st century in Accra
Africa Cup of Nations